The N-400 is a highway in Spain from Toledo to Cuenca.  It is being upgraded to the Autovía A-40, section by section.

It starts at the junction of the N-401, and the Autovía A-42 east of Toledo.

It heads east to Aranjuez and the Autopista R-4 and Autovía A-4.  It then heads east with a junction to the N-301.  There is also a junction with the Autovía A-3 at Taracón.

The N-400 then heads through the Altos de Cabrejas to Cuenca and has been partly upgraded to the Autovía A-40.

National roads in Spain
Transport in Castilla–La Mancha